The 2004 London Broncos season was the twenty-fifth in the club's history and their ninth season in the Super League. The club was coached by Tony Rea, competing in Super League IX and finishing in 10th place. The club also got to the fifth round of the Challenge Cup.

2004 London Broncos squad
Sources: 
London BroncosLONDON BRONCOS 2004 SQUAD.

Super League table IX

2004 Challenge Cup
For the fifth consecutive year, the Broncos were knocked out of the cup at the fifth round stage.

References

External links
London Broncos - Rugby League Project

London Broncos seasons
London Broncos